Oskar Sikow (Oskar Engström) is a RIAA Gold awarded record producer and songwriter from Stockholm, Sweden. Sikow has collaborated with artists such as Kacy Hill, LANY, Skott, Erik Hassle, among others. He was a founding member of the alternative pop band Kate Boy but left the band in 2013, and of late has started the new artist project Snow Culture together with Swedish artist and songwriter Ana Diaz.

Production and writing credits

References 

Swedish record producers
Musicians from Stockholm
Swedish songwriters
Living people
Year of birth missing (living people)